The Beijing Stock Exchange (BSE) is a stock exchange based in Beijing, China. It is one of the three stock exchanges operating independently in mainland China, the others being the Shanghai Stock Exchange and the Shenzhen Stock Exchange.

History

The Beijing municipal government had lobbied for years to upgrade the National Equities Exchange and Quotations (NEEQ) exchange (nicknamed "The New Third Board" (新三板)) to act as a home for US-listed Chinese firms.

On 2 September 2021, China's leader, Xi Jinping announced the establishment of the Beijing Stock Exchange. The purpose was to help serve small and medium-sized enterprises (SMEs) in China.

This was done by reforming the NEEQ exchange and setting up the Beijing Stock Exchange as the primary platform for SMEs. As of 2020, the NEEQ exchange had almost 6,000 companies listed with most of them being SMEs.

On 3 September 2021, Beijing Stock Exchange Co., Ltd. completed its business registration as a company. The registration information showed the sole shareholder was NEEQ making it the owner of the Beijing Stock Exchange. The registered capital of the company was RMB 1 billion and the registered address was the same as NEEQ's one.

On 17 September 2021, the Beijing Stock Exchange issued guidelines on the qualifying criteria for investors.

On 30 October 2021, the China Securities Regulatory Commission published rules for the exchange regarding initial public offerings (IPO), refinancing and supervision.

On 15 November 2021, trading on the Beijing Stock Exchange commenced. 81 companies debuted trading on the exchange that day. 71 of them were transferred from the “Select tier” of the NEEQ Exchange. The remaining 10 companies held their trading debuts.

Rules

 Individual investors are required to have securities assets of at least RMB 500,000 and at least two years of experience in securities investing to qualify for trading on the bourse.
Institutional investors are not subject to capital requirements. 
On the debut trading day of a stock, there is no limit on a stock's price change. Trading will be temporarily suspended for 10 minutes if the stock's price rises above 30% or drops over 60%.
After the first trading day, stocks traded on the exchange will not be allowed to rise or fall more than 30% within a single trading day.

See also
 China Securities Regulatory Commission
 Economy of China
 Hong Kong Stock Exchange
 Shanghai Stock Exchange
 Shenzhen Stock Exchange

Lists
 List of Chinese companies
 List of companies in the People's Republic of China
 List of stock exchanges

References

External links

 
Stock exchanges in China
Economy of Beijing
Companies based in Beijing
Organizations based in Beijing